Gabriela Tagliavini is an Argentine writer/director best known for her feature films Without Men, Perfect Lover, and Ladies' Night.

Early life 
Tagliavini was born in Buenos Aires, Argentina. She received a bachelor's degree in film directing and a master's degree in screenwriting from the American Film Institute (AFI).

Career 
For her directorial debut, The Woman Every Man Wants (aka Perfect Lover), Tagliavini won the Best Director award at three international film festivals in 2001.

Her film Ladies' Night was the #1 movie in the box office in Mexico in 2004 and won three MTV Movie Awards Mexico. The soundtrack was released by Sony.

Tagliavini's TV film, the Viacom/VH1/MTV/Maverick feature 30 Days Until I'm Famous, premiered on VH1. The film stars Sean Patrick Flanery, Mindy Sterling, Udo Kier and Carmen Electra and was executive-produced by Madonna. Tagliavini's fourth feature as a writer-director, Without Men, starring Eva Longoria (Desperate Housewives) and Christian Slater (True Romance), was released in the U.S. in 2011. She has recently adapted the best-selling novel The Anatomist for HBO Films and the screenplay for Cantinflas (a biopic about the Mexican comedian-thesp). Tagliavini recently finished directing her fifth feature, Border Run (aka The Mule), starring Sharon Stone and Billy Zane.

In addition to directing commercials and television pilots, Tagliavini also worked as a writer/correspondent for CNN. She was a juror at the Berlin Film Festival, and won the prestigious 2006 ABC/DGA directing fellowship, where she worked on shows like Disney's Hannah Montana and Desperate Housewives. Tagliavini helmed a live show, Comedy Rehab, for Comedy Central.

Tagliavini is also the author of a novel, Los Colores de La Memoria, originally published in Spanish in Argentina, then rewritten in English for U.S. readers as The Colors of Memory.

Awards, nominations, honors 
Bogota Film Festival (2004)
Nominated, Golden Precolumbian Circle Best Film for Ladies' Night.
Imagen Foundation Awards (2012)
Nominated, Imagen Award Best Director/Feature Film for Without Men
New York International Independent Film & Video Festival (2001)
Won, Feature Film Award Best Director for Perfect Lover.
No Dance Film Festival (2001)
Won, Best Director for Perfect Lover.
Santa Monica Film Festival (2001)
Won, Moxie! Award Best Comedy Feature for Perfect Lover.

See also 
 List of female film and television directors
 List of LGBT-related films directed by women

References

External links
 
 

Argentine film directors
Argentine women film directors
Argentine screenwriters
Argentine television directors
Women screenwriters
Argentine LGBT screenwriters
Living people
Women television directors
English-language film directors
1968 births
Writers from Buenos Aires